Wendy Harrison is an American politician from the state of Vermont who will represent the Windham County district in the Vermont Senate from January 2023. A member of the Democratic Party, she previously worked as a traveling municipal manager, serving as the interim city manager of multiple towns across Vermont including Rockingham, Bellows Falls, Vernon, and Winooski.

References

Living people
Democratic Party Vermont state senators
Women state legislators in Vermont
21st-century American politicians
21st-century American women politicians
Year of birth missing (living people)
Place of birth missing (living people)